3rd Millennium's Choice, Vol. 1 is a compilation album by the German electronic composer Peter Frohmader, released independently in 1990.

Track listing

Personnel 
Adapted from the 3rd Millennium's Choice, Vol. 1 liner notes.
 Peter Frohmader – electronics, cover art
 Jürgen Jung – spoken word (1)
 Stephan Manus – violin (3)

Release history

References 

1990 compilation albums
Peter Frohmader albums